This organisation is the national governing body for roller sports in the country. Roller Sports Canada recognises roller derby as a roller sport.

See also

 International Roller Sports Federation
International Roller Sports Federation - Inline
 Roller derby in Canada

References

External links
Roller Sports Canada

Roller skating organizations
Roller derby in Canada
Sports governing bodies in Canada